He Hated Pigeons is a 2015 Canadian-Chilean drama film, produced, written, and directed by Ingrid Veninger. The film stars Pedro Fontaine as Elias, a gay Chilean man travelling the length of the country following the death of his partner Sebastian (played by Cristobal Tapia Montt in flashbacks).

The film's music followed a unique model. Although a score was written by Ohad Benchetrit and Justin Small of the band Do Make Say Think, it was not included in the film print, and instead was performed live by various musicians at each public screening of the film. The musicians performing the score were further permitted to improvise, so that each performance of the score would be unique.

The film was made after Veninger travelled to Chile to attend a retrospective screening of her work at a film festival; as she was not fluent in Spanish, Fontaine was hired as her interpreter, and Veninger decided to make a film with him after getting to know him.

Dylan Macleod won the Borsos Competition award for best cinematography in a Canadian film at the 2015 Whistler Film Festival.

References

External links

2015 films
2015 drama films
2015 LGBT-related films
Canadian drama films
Canadian LGBT-related films
Chilean drama films
Chilean LGBT-related films
LGBT-related drama films
Films directed by Ingrid Veninger
Gay-related films
2010s Canadian films